is a series of Japanese animated family adventure films inspired by One Thousand and One Nights and produced by Nippon Animation and Shirogumi. Made in celebration of the former company's 40th anniversary, the trilogy of films were directed by Shinpei Miyashita and written by Kaeko Hayafune and Hiroyuki Kawasaki. Miyashita died during the production of the third film, which was later dedicated to him. The film was finished by his student, Terumi Toyama.

The first film, was released in Japan on July 4, 2015, by Aeon Entertainment. Pony Canyon released it on DVD on December 16, 2015. The second film, was released theatrically on January 16, 2016, and on DVD on May 3, 2016. The third and final film, was released theatrically as part of a compilation with the two others films on May 14, 2016. It was later released individually on DVD on December 21, 2016.

The three films were released in Japanese with English subtitles and with an English dub by Ocean Productions on Amazon Video in the United States and the United Kingdom in April 2017.

On 8 August 2021, an Indian Kids TV channel ETV Bal Bharat premiered Sinbad (the compilation film), dubbed in 12 different languages (audio feeds): English, Hindi, Tamil, Telugu, Marathi, Bengali, Punjabi, Malayalam, Kannada, Assamese, Gujarati and Odia.

Cast

Japanese
Tomo Muranaka as Sinbad
Naomi Nagasawa as Ali
Momoko Tanabe as Sana
Hiroko Yakushimaru as Latifa, Sinbad's mother
Takeshi Kaga as Captain Razzak

English
Cole Howard as Sinbad
Travis Turner as Ali
Elyse Maloway as Sana
Rebecca Shoichet as Latifa, Sinbad's mother
Michael Adamthwaite as Captain Razzak
Riley Murdock as Galip

References

External links
 - Series site 
 - First film 
 - Second film 
Nippon Animation Official website

2015 anime films
Film series introduced in 2015
2016 anime films
2010s adventure films
Adventure anime and manga
Animated adventure films
Anime and manga based on fairy tales
Films based on Sinbad the Sailor
Japanese animated fantasy films
Japanese fantasy adventure films
Japanese film series
Nippon Animation films
Shirogumi